Eucosma rubescana is a species of moth belonging to the family Tortricidae.

It is native to Western Europe.

References

Eucosmini
Moths described in 1895